Marjolein Silvia Lips-Wiersma is a New Zealand academic. She specializes in Ethics, Meaningful Work and Sustainability. She is currently a full professor at the Auckland University of Technology.

Academic career

Marjo Lips-Wiersma is Professor of Ethics and Sustainability Leadership at AUT. In 1999 she submitted a doctoral thesis titled The influence of 'spiritual meaning-making' on career choice, transition and experience at the University of Auckland. Her research takes place at the nexus of Meaningful Work, Sustainability, Hope and Well-being.  Lips-Wiersma's research on meaningful work is used in a variety of organisations around the world and she is co-director of the Map of Meaning (https://www.themapofmeaning.org) which, through training and certifying practitioners, helps individuals and organisations to talk about, create and maintain meaningful work.

Lips-Wiersma has published in journals such as the Journal of Business Ethics, the journal of Organizational Behavior, the Journal of Management Studies,  Leadership Quarterly, Group & Organization Management and the Journal of Management Inquiry and has been a member of several editorial boards. She has teaches ethics, sustainability, responsible leadership and qualitative research methods at undergraduate, postgraduate and MBA levels.

Selected works 
 Lips-Wiersma, Marjolein, and Lani Morris. "Discriminating between ‘meaningful work’and the ‘management of meaning’." Journal of Business Ethics 88, no. 3 (2009): 491-511.
Algera, Puck M., and Marjolein Lips-Wiersma. "Radical authentic leadership: Co-creating the conditions under which all members of the organization can be authentic." The Leadership Quarterly 23, no. 1 (2012): 118–131.
Lips-Wiersma, Marjolein. "The influence of spiritual “meaning-making” on career behavior." Journal of Management Development 21, no. 7 (2002): 497-520.
 Lips‐Wiersma, Marjolein, and Douglas T. Hall. "Organizational career development is not dead: A case study on managing the new career during organizational change." Journal of Organizational Behavior: The International Journal of Industrial, Occupational and Organizational Psychology and Behavior 28, no. 6 (2007): 771–792.
 Lips-Wiersma, Marjolein, and Colleen Mills. "Coming out of the closet: Negotiating spiritual expression in the workplace." Journal of managerial Psychology 17, no. 3 (2002): 183–202.

References

==External links==

The Map of Meaningful Work

Living people
Year of birth missing (living people)
New Zealand women academics
University of Auckland alumni
Academic staff of the University of Canterbury
Academic staff of the Auckland University of Technology
New Zealand women writers